France-Albert René (16 November 1934 – 27 February 2019) was a Seychellois lawyer, politician and statesman who served as the second President of Seychelles from 1977 to 2004. He also served as the country's 2nd Prime Minister from its independence in 1976 to 1977.

He was nicknamed by Seychellois government officials and fellow party members as "the Boss". His name is often given as simply Albert René or F.A. René; he was also nicknamed Ti France.

Early life 
France-Albert was born to Price René, a plantation manager and administrator, and Luisa Morgan René, a seamstress, on 16 November 1934 in Victoria, on the island of Mahe, Crown Colony of Seychelles, but spent early childhood on Farquhar. The ''modest'' family did not belong to the upper class, despite their European origins. The family returned to Victoria, Mahe when France Albert was 5-year-old boy and was sent to St Joseph’s Convent, and later to St Louis College. With the help of scholarships, René was able to attend secondary education at Saint Louis College of the Marist Brothers in Victoria on Mahé. In 1952, at the age of 17, René was granted a scholarship in Switzerland to study theology at the Capuchin Seminary of St Maurice in the canton Valais. After his first year, in 1954, he was transferred to study law at St. Mary's College, Southampton, England, and later completed his university education at King's College London. In 1957 he qualified as a lawyer at King’s College in London, serving until 1961, and joined Middle Temple. While abroad, he became heavily involved in the politics of the Labour Party, at the time led by Clement Attlee and later Hugh Gaitskell. These experiences led him to adopt a moderate socialist ideology that favoured some state intervention in the economy and strong ties with conservative forces such as the Roman Catholic Church – René's initial career goal was to join the priesthood. Later, René denounced local church leaders who criticised his policies. From 1962 to 1964 he also studied economics at the London School of Economics. Upon returning to his homeland in 1964, young and enthusiastic René practiced law in Victoria. However, he became disappointed with the social policies of British colonialism that created massive injustice among the population. As a result, he decided to participate in the political development of his country. René also launched a newspaper, The People.

Politics 
It was not until 1964 that any new political movements were created. In that year, the Seychelles People's United Party (SPUP, later Seychelles People's Progressive Front, SPPF), the forerunner to today's party United Seychelles (US), was formed. Led by France-Albert René, a founding member, they campaigned for socialism and independence from Britain. The late London-trained lawyer James Mancham's Seychelles Democratic Party (SDP), created the same year, by contrast represented conservatives, businessmen and planters and wanted closer integration with Britain. After being elected to the legislative assembly of the colony in 1965, together with his party comrades, he actively fought for granting it self-government, and then independence. Elections were held in 1966, won by the SDP. In 1970 Seychelles obtained a new constitution, universal adult suffrage, and a governing council with an elected majority.

In March 1970, colonial and political representatives of Seychelles met in London for a constitutional convention, with the Seychelles Democratic Party (SDP) of James Mancham advocating closer integration with the UK, and the Seychelles People's United Party (SPUP) of France-Albert René advocating independence. Further elections in November 1970 brought a new constitution into effect, with Mancham as Chief Minister. Further elections were held in April 1974, in which both major political parties campaigned for independence. In 1975, in the colonial government, he became Minister of Public Works and Land Development of the coalition government, which also included representatives of the Democratic Party (DP). Following the election, negotiations with the British resulted in an agreement under which the Seychelles became an independent republic within the Commonwealth on 29 June 1976. The newly knighted Sir James Mancham became the country's first President, with René as Prime Minister, following assembly elections in which the Seychelles People's United Party (SPUP) came in second place. These negotiations also restored the islands of Aldabra, Farquhar, and Des Roches, which had been transferred from Seychelles in November 1965 to form part of the new British Indian Ocean Territory (BIOT), to Seychelles upon independence.

1977 coup 

When Mancham told him he had been seen practising with rifles on an uninhabited island, Rene coolly told him he had been ''shooting rabbits'', and had a brace delivered to the president's office.

While James Mancham was away overseas to attend the Commonwealth Heads of Government Conference in London and celebrate the Silver Jubilee of Queen Elizabeth II, on 4–5 June 1977, less than a year after independence, between 60-200 partisan Tanzanian-trained supporters of René installed him as president in a bloodless coup d'état. René's claim that he was not party to the coup was challenged during hearing of the Truth Reconciliation and National Unity Commission in 2019 and 2020 when known a participant acknowledged that he had been involved in the planning and execution. The insurgents took control of strategic points on Mahé. The central police station was seized "virtually without a shot being fired." In contrast, there was an exchange of fire at the Mont Fleuri police station, where the arsenal was kept. Three men were killed and a policeman and one of the insurgents were killed in the fighting. The plotters arrested six British Armed Forces officers, who had been advising the Seychelles Police Force since 1976. The officers and their families, as well as the Chief Justice of the Supreme Court, Aiden O'Brien Quinn, a judge from Ireland similarly on loan by his Government, were flown to Europe; the island was put under curfew.

When approached by the insurgents, René was said to have accepted the Presidency on three conditions: that the safety of political individuals be guaranteed, that international agreements remain in force, and that elections be planned for 1978 (they were eventually held in 1979). René, who denied knowing of the plan, was then sworn in as President and formed a new government. After coming to power, René declared that he was not a Soviet-style Communist, but rather an "Indian Ocean socialist" and "socialist pan-Africanist". Early on he opposed the Anglo-American military installation on the Indian Ocean atoll of Diego Garcia because of the possible storage of nuclear weapons. René discouraged over-dependence on tourism and declared that he wanted "to keep the Seychelles for the Seychellois".

''Socialist paradise''

Domestic policies 

René's party, renamed the Seychelles People's Progressive Front (SPPF) in 1978, was the sole legal party from 1979 to 1991, largely financed from Tanzania, Algeria, Libya and the GDR. The newly reformed system of one-party socialism featured a directly elected president, as well as the original plurality system of legislative representation. All political activity took place under the rule of the Seychelles People's Progressive Front, and the President was voted for on a yes-no basis by any Seychelles citizen 17 or older. The president enjoyed almost unchecked executive power, and appointed his own cabinet as well as his own chair of the Assembly. The legislature itself was unable to rule independently, and instead only enacted the bills proposed by the executive. Criticism of René or any aspect of his government was not tolerated. 
This allowed him to be the only presidential candidate for elections in 1979, 1984, and 1989, which he won with over 90% of the vote. Multiparty democracy commenced around 1994, but René continued to win in 1993, and in 1998 and in 2001, when he defeated the opposition leader Wavel Ramkalawan, the candidate of Seychelles National Party. In addition to presidency, he held several cabinet posts simultaneously including Minister of Foreign Affairs (1977-1979) and Minister of Finance (1981-1989), Minister of Finance and Industry (1984-1989), Minister of Planning and External Relations (1986–93), Minister of Interior and Defence, Minister of Industry (since 1998). In 1988 he added Tourism. The last addition was ironic, as he grudgingly acknowledged in private that he would be happier if no foreigners ever visited. In 1978-84 Chairman, and since June 1984 Secretary General of the SPPF. In 1979, a planned invasion of Seychelles by supporters of Mancham with the assistance of American diplomatic staff in Kenya and Seychelles was discovered before it could be carried out. An official investigation also implicated France with involvement in the coup.

The SPPF instituted a number of reforms, including universal access to education and healthcare, as well as environmental reforms. Compared to the rest of Africa, the Seychelles scored well in terms of child mortality, literacy rate, median income and standard of living. During this period, the Seychelles developed rapidly, to the point that it became the most developed country in Africa on the Human Development Index. The situation for Seychellois Creole people, who constitute the majority of the nation's population, also improved significantly due to domestic policies implemented by President René aimed at racial equity. However, the white minority (mainly Franco-Seychellois) still occupied most important posts (ministerial and parliamentary) in the state administration and dominated the ranks of the party leadership. Like his predecessor Mancham, he focused on expanding tourism . In order to finance social spending, René also promoted the settlement of international banks and established an offshore financial center . Despite the occasional coup attempts, his regime was considered stable due to the balancing of interests between socialism and capitalism.

Foreign policy 
Diplomatic relations with China were established on 30 June 1976. China began providing Seychelles with diplomatic aide in 1977, including things such as constructing a poly-technical school and developing housing project in Les Mamelles. In 2002, China exported US$1.48 million worth of goods, while importing only $100,000 from Seychelles.

Diplomatic ties with India have existed since Seychelles gained independence in 1976. A resident high commissioner of India has been in Victoria since 1987 while Seychelles opened its resident mission in New Delhi in 2008. Relations between the two countries have been warm and cordial with regular high level exchange visits between the countries. From India, Prime Minister Indira Gandhi and Presidents R Venkataraman and Pratibha Patil have visited the Seychelles, while Rene, Michel and Faure of Seychelles have paid state visits to India.

In 1986, Seychelles brought around U$600,000 Malaysian products directly but purchased U$7 million through indirect trade with Singapore, thus the country are looking for a direct trade with Malaysia to get Malaysian products without using Singapore ports. In 1988, an agreement to promote co-operation in the fields of culture, education, sports and information was signed.

During the rule of René, the socialist and non-aligned government of Seychelles – a small African Indian Ocean island nation – maintained close relations with the Democratic Republic of Korea, commonly known as North Korea. The country received significant North Korean developmental aid. Much of the cooperation was military. Uniformed North Korean soldiers were present in the country in 1980. Another example of military cooperation was the 1983 deployment of fifty-five North Korean instructors and interpreters to aid the military of Seychelles. During his time in power, René visited Pyongyang several times, meeting with Kim Il-sung. During one meeting in 1988, he expressed support for Korean reunification, and applauded the idea of a Democratic Confederal Republic of Koryo. At the end of that visit, the two countries signed a treaty of economic cooperation.

Relations between Seychelles and the Soviet Union were established a day after the island nation gained its independence from the UK. On 15 February 1980, the USSR and Seychelles signed the Agreement on merchant navigation in Victoria. The government of René supported the Soviet invasion of Afghanistan. In 1987 The Sunday Times, quoting unnamed US intelligence officers, reported that the Soviet Union had landed 50 naval infantry troops in the Seychelles after making landfall on the Ivan Rogov in October 1986; a month after a foiled assassination attempt on René. In 1999 an agreement on co-operation in the field of tourism was concluded between the two nations.

The year 1963 marked the beginning of an official U.S. presence in Seychelles when the U.S. Air Force Tracking Station was built and put into operation on Mahé. The USAF Tracking Station facilities were situated on land that was leased from the Seychelles Government ($4.5 million annually). The station's complement consisted of five uniformed Air Force personnel (two officers and three sergeants), 65 employees of Loral Corporation and Johnson Instruments, and 150 Seychellois employees. The USAF Tracking Station officially closed down on 30 September 1996. Peace Corps Volunteers served in Seychelles between 1974 and 1995. A U.S. consulate was opened in May 1976 and became an Embassy after Seychelles' independence in June 1976. The Embassy was subsequently closed in August 1996, and the United States opened a consular agency on 2 September 1996, to provide services to residents of Seychelles. The agency is under the supervision of the American Embassy in Port Louis, Mauritius. The U.S. Ambassador to Mauritius also is accredited to Seychelles.

Coups d'etat 
Numerous coup attempts were thwarted during the 1980s; only in the first 2.5 years of the new government there were three of them, similar attempts were also made in 1981, 1982, 1986 and 1987. On 25 November 1981, Seychellois security forces put down a coup attempt sponsored by South Africa. Notorious British Colonel "Mad Mike" Hoare and a team of 43 mercenaires posed as members of the "Ancient Order of Froth Blowers", a defunct charitable beer-drinking fraternity, visiting the islands as tourists. Shortly after leaving their Royal Swazi National Airways aircraft, an airport security guard spotted a Kalashnikov assault rifle in their luggage; the discovery launched a gun battle in which hostages were taken. Most of the mercenaries escaped after hijacking another Air India plane sitting on the runway.
The author John Perkins has alleged that this was part of a covert action to re-install the pro-American former president in the face of concerns about United States access to its military bases in Diego Garcia.[better source needed]

An independent inquiry by the United Nations found that South African intelligence was indeed behind the coup; Hoare described the reaction he received from a Central Intelligence Agency (CIA) agent in Pretoria as "extremely timid".  However, it is suspected by some that the United States played a significant direct role in the incident, and there was co-operation at the time between the CIA and the South African government on other issues. Three million dollars were paid to President René and his government by South Africa for the return of the remaining mercenaries detained in Seychelles. The 1981 attempt was the second major threat to his government at the time.

The government was threatened again by an army mutiny in August 1982, but it was quelled after 2 days when loyal troops, reinforced by Tanzanian forces & several of the mercenaries that had escaped from the prison, recaptured the rebel-held installations. In the attempts to overthrow him at times resembled a Gilbert and Sullivan opera, he kept such an iron grip on the islands that would-be counter-revolutionaries went in fear of their lives.

Gérard Hoarau, of the exiled opposition, was head of the Mouvement Pour La Resistance (MPR). His opposition to the dictatorship of René was based in London and he was assassinated on 29 November 1985 by an unidentified gunman on the doorstep of his London home. Hoarau is buried in London. In 1985, after the assassination of Hoarau, the Seychelles community in exile put together a program titled SIROP (Seychelles International Repatriation and Onward Program).

In 1986, an attempted coup led by the Seychelles Minister of Defence, Ogilvy Berlouis, caused President René to request assistance from India. In Operation Flowers are Blooming, the Indian naval vessel Vindhyagiri arrived in Port Victoria to help avert the coup. Despite these attempts, for the most part René ruled throughout this period with underground opposition at home. He used Seychelles' strategic importance to obtain significant help from both superpowers of the period without having to commit himself to either. With a suppressed opposition, he was able to power through much needed social reforms. In June 1986, the Indian Navy deployed the INS Vindhyagiri at the Seychelles Port of Victoria to abort an attempted coup against President Rene by Defence Minister Berlouis in what was called Operation Flowers are Blooming. India helped avert a further attempted coup by Berlouis in September 1986, when Indian Prime Minister Rajiv Gandhi lent President René his plane so that he could fly back from an international meeting in Harare to the Seychelles. President René reportedly took shelter in the resident of the Indian High Commissioner in Male.

In February 1992, Conrad Greslé, a local accountant, landowner and advocate of multi-party democracy in Seychelles was arrested and charged with treason for allegedly planning to overthrow President René's régime with the apparent aid of foreign mercenaries and with supposed CIA involvement. Greslé died in Seychelles in July 1992 and is survived by his wife Sylvia, son Neville and daughters Natasha and Yvette Greslé.

A number of Seychellois were displaced and exiled by the dictatorship. The Greslé family were one of a few landowners of largely French descent to remain after the coup d'état of 1977 – most had their land confiscated and were exiled. Any individual who publicly resisted the René régime was vulnerable to threats, intimidation, or exile throughout the 1980s. Disappearances and what appear to be politically motivated killing did take place but these are not officially documented or acknowledged.[citation needed] A number of Seychellois families are now calling for official acknowledgement of politically motivated violence subsequent to the 1977 coup. Although he was white, he found greatest support among the islanders with a clear African ancestry.

Democracy 
Faced with mounting pressure from the country’s primary sources of foreign aid, René’s administration began moving toward more democratic rule in the early 1990s. Following the collapse of the Berlin Wall and dissolution of the Soviet Union, at an Extraordinary Congress of the Seychelles People's Progressive Front (SPPF) on 4 December 1991, under the pressure of the opposition and France and Great Britain, President René announced a return to the multiparty system of government after almost 16 years of one-party rule. On 27 December 1991, the Constitution of Seychelles was amended to allow for the registration of political parties. Among the exiles returning to Seychelles was James Mancham, who returned in April 1992 to revive his party, the Democratic Party (DP). By the end of that month, eight political parties had registered to contest the first stage of the transition process: election to the constitutional commission, which took place on 23–26 July 1992.

The constitutional commission was made up of 22 elected members, 14 from the SPPF and 8 from the DP. It commenced work on 27 August 1992, with both President René and Mancham calling for national reconciliation and consensus on a new democratic constitution. The first draft of a new constitution failed to receive the requisite 60% of voters in 1992, but an amended version was approved in 1993. A consensus text was agreed upon on 7 May 1993, and a referendum to approve it was called for 15–18 June. The draft was approved with 73.9% of the electorate in favor of it and 24.1% against.

The first multiparty presidential and legislative elections since 1974 held under the new constitution was held between 23–26 July 1993, as well as a resounding victory for President René. Three political groups contested the elections – the SPPF, the DP, and the United Opposition (UO) – a coalition of three smaller political parties, including Parti Seselwa. Two other smaller opposition parties threw in their lot with the DP. All participating parties and international observer groups accepted the results as "free and fair."

Three candidates contested the 20–22 March 1998 presidential election: France-Albert René of the SPPF, James Mancham of the DP, and Wavel Ramkalawan. President René and his SPPF won by a landslide. The president's popularity in elections jumped to 66.6% in 1998 from 59.5% in 1993, while the SPPF garnered 61.7% of the total votes cast in the 1998 National Assembly election, compared to 56.5% in 1993. In 1999, Mancham switched to the centrist liberal Seychelles National Party (SNP) which emerged as the major opposition party, losing to the SPPF in 2002 parliamentary election with 42% of the vote. In his State of the Nation Address 2004, France-Albert René humbly but proudly said: “I trust that when you walk across our islands, you’ll conclude that I have done my duty as a Seychellois worker”.

Resignation and later life 
On 24 February 2004, René announced that he would be stepping down in favour of his long-time lieutenant, comrade and Vice-President James Alix Michel (who served until 2016), who had been in office since 1996. He did so on 14 July, whereupon he remained as leader of the People's Progressive Front, which honored him as its patron and founder. Before that, he bought a ranch in Australia, where he was going to spend the rest of his life with his third wife. Michel, ''pale shadow'', would go on to win the 2006 presidential election against SNP leader Ramkalawan with 53.5% of the vote. France-Albert René has also endorsed a book, “Albert René – The Father of the Modern Seychelles” by British historian, Dr Kevin Shillington. The full-length biography, published in 2014, analyses his early years in politics and his struggle against colonialism. But, Rene's political power weakened with the time. As a result, that power base showed signs of weakening when his party lost 2016 parliamentary elections to the opposition. Even after he stepped down in 2004, René remained a long shadow over the land and head of his party and was nicknamed the “Kingmaker” and “the Boss” for the influence he wielded in Seychelles, a string of 115 islands with a population of around 95,000 that are a haven for wealthy tourists. Though in his 80s when he returned from surgery abroad a little over a year before his death, the country’s President and most of the cabinet considered it prudent to be at the airport to pay their respects and welcome him home.

René, who dominated politics in the Indian Ocean archipelago for nearly three decades died on Wednesday, 27 February 2019 in Mahé, Seychelles in hospital from respiratory failure, aged 83. Albert Rene will receive a state funeral and will be laid to rest in the grounds of State House alongside the island’s founding President and British and French personalities of the past. “It is with deep sorrow that I hereby announce that former president France-Albert René passed away early today,” then-President Danny Faure said in a national radio broadcast, describing Mr René as the “modern-day architect of Seychelles”. The former president had been admitted to hospital with an undisclosed illness for respiratory problems on 12 February. “Many people voted for Rene’s party to honor him, but now that he is gone, I don’t see them winning again soon,” said a fisherman who declined to give his name, as he set out on his boat at Anse aux Pins.

Dolor Ernesta who served as minister in René’s government, said: “The President will be remembered as a true leader who led the fight for independence. I will also remember him as having a great vision for the development of the new Seychelles as we know it today, for he truly loved his country”. Paul Chow who was forced to go exile during the René regime said that two men had made the history of Seychelles, presidents “James Mancham and France-Albert René”. Although the political refugee pins his hopes on judgements of history to revise the value of F.A. René’s presidency for the country and his Seychellois regime outcomes. Chinese President Xi Jinping on Friday sent a message of condolences to Seychelles President Danny Faure over the passing of former President France Albert Rene. In his message, Xi expressed profound condolences over the passing of Rene and extended his sympathy to the relatives of the former president. Calling Rene an old friend of the Chinese people, Xi said that Rene had made important contributions to advancing the cause of China-Seychelles friendship. China is willing to work with Seychelles to push forward their friendly relations and cooperation in order to bring more benefits to the two countries and peoples, Xi said.

Private life 
Rene's personal life was always a matter of hot gossip in Seychelles. A noted ''ladies' man'' and a dangerous political enemy he commanded loyalty from his followers. In 1956, René married English Karen Handley with whom he had a daughter. His estranged wife Karen Handley commented about the 1977 coup: “René plotted his communist revolution from my semi in Luton”. In 1975 France-Albert married Geva Savy Adam whose three sons he treated as his own, giving them positions of power. In 1992 René divorced Geva after almost 20-year marriage and in 1993, at 58, got married for the third time. His bride was Sarah Zarqani, 25 years his junior, with whom he had three daughters. She survived him with his children. As is common in Seychelles, he had numerous mistresses, some of whom undoubtedly bore him children. One of his chief girlfriends joked: ''I don't mind him having all his mistresses, I just wish he didn't give them all a corner shop". Locally, such rumors brought him more admiration than scandal. When confronted about the allegations by a BBC reporter he simply said: ''I've always made a hobby out of fishing''. In the same interview he was asked if he worried about being labelled ''autocrat of a banana republic''. He replied: ''I'd rather want you to call me president of a coconut republic. We don't grow much bananas over here. It must be a step up from being a leader of a banana republic". France-Albert René was very proud of his rich Creole culture and encouraged Seychellois people to develop it further. In later life Rene would often refer to his island boyhood, and habits like fishing and eating traditional creole food prepared on the island remained with him throughout his life. Farquhar is still remote and magical place, where sharks and turtles, seabirds and endless blue horizon are the dominant sights and sounds.

Legacy 
Until 2018 René was characterized as a prime example of a benevolent dictator as well as a well-loved and respected national figure, leading his country to the point of being the most developed country in Africa – as measured by the Human Development Index – and helping build one of the continent's highest gross domestic products per capita.

However, the setting up of the Truth Reconciliation and National Unity Commission (TRNUC) in 2018, and their hearings (televised day after day in real time, and recorded on YouTube) revealed the testimonies of people who had been tortured, and from relatives of people who had been murdered, tortured, disappeared, assassinated, detained without trial, as well as evidence of financial crimes and looting of the state and private individuals, led to a reassessment of his record. His supporters believe that he had solid social priorities, including his government's extensive funding of education, health care and the environment. Critical indicators, such as infant mortality, literacy rate, and economic well-being, are among the best in the continent. During his rule, the Seychelles avoided the volatile political climate and underdevelopment in neighbouring island countries such as the Comoros and Madagascar.

His critics believe that he and his party are responsible for torture and other human rights abuses involving opponents of the government, allegedly including the death of a prominent dissident in London, Gérard Hoarau. After the 1977 coup, a significant portion of the population, including the deposed President James Mancham, fled to the UK and South Africa due to political persecution and fear of the new government's expropriation and reprisals, and alignment with the Soviet Union, Tanzania and North Korea. Between 1977 and 1984 four thousand Seychelles left the country (mainly to Britain and South Africa). In the period from 1979 to 1989, according to official statistics, about 1 thousand people a year left the country (which is more than 1% of the country's population). René also faced international pressure regarding his government's former requirement that all applicants to the country's secondary education system graduate a compulsory National Youth Service, which included traditional curricula, political education and, according to some critics, ideological indoctrination and paramilitary training.This requirement was abandoned after the transition to multiparty rule and the organisation was eventually abolished entirely. Some critics of the former René regime also point to corruption and cronyism during his tenure.

References

Further reading

External links 
Seychelles People's Progressive Front
Website of The People newspaper and SPPF Museum (pro-René; he formerly edited the publication)

1934 births
2019 deaths
Alumni of King's College London
Presidents of Seychelles
Finance Ministers of Seychelles
Foreign Ministers of Seychelles
Public works ministers of Seychelles
Leaders who took power by coup
Seychellois Roman Catholics
Seychellois socialists
Seychellois lawyers
Seychellois people of French descent
United Seychelles Party politicians
Prime Ministers of Seychelles
Deaths in Seychelles